Leucorhynchia lirata is a species of sea snail, a marine gastropod mollusk in the family Skeneidae.

Description
The height of the shell attains 2 mm, its diameter 3 mm. The white, subimperforate shell is very small and has a globular shape. The spire contains 3½ finely lirate whorls. It is strongly plicate beneath the suture and around the umbilical callosity. The aperture is rounded. The peristome is continuous.

Distribution
This species occurs in the Atlantic Ocean off Senegal and Angola.

References

 Gofas, S.; Afonso, J.P.; Brandào, M. (Ed.). (S.a.). Conchas e Moluscos de Angola = Coquillages et Mollusques d'Angola. [Shells and molluscs of Angola]. Universidade Agostinho / Elf Aquitaine Angola: Angola. 140 pp

External links
 

lirata
Gastropods described in 1871